Krishna Rani Sarkar (Bengali: কৃষ্ণা রানী সরকার; born 1 January 2001) is a Bangladeshi women's football forward. She currently plays at the Bangladesh women's national football team and Suti V. M. Pilot Model High School, Tangail. She was a member of the AFC U-14 Girls' Regional Championship – South and Central winning team in Nepal in 2015. She was the Captain of the Bangladesh women's national under-17 football team.

Playing career

International
Krishna was selected to the Bangladesh women's U-17 team for the 2015 AFC U-16 Women's Championship qualification – Group B matches in 2014. She played four matches and scored one goal in that tournament. She was also an integral member of the team which won AFC U-14 Girls' Regional Championship – South and Central in 2015.

She was named as Captain for 2017 AFC U-16 Women's Championship qualification – Group C matches. She played tremendously in the tournament scoring 8 goals in 5 matches. Being group C champion, Bangladesh have qualified for the 2017 AFC U-16 Women's Championship in Thailand in September 2017.

International goals
Scores and results list Bangladesh's goal tally first.

Honours 
Bashundhara Kings Women
 Bangladesh Women's Football League: 2019–20, 2020–21

Bangladesh
SAFF Women's Championship: 2022; runner-up: 2016
South Asian Games bronze medal: 2016
Bangladesh U-19
SAFF U-18 Women's Championship: 2018
Bangamata U-19 Women's International Gold Cup: 2019
Bangladesh U-14
AFC U-14 Girls' Regional C'ship – South and Central: 2015

References

2001 births
Living people
Bangladeshi women's footballers
Bangladesh women's international footballers
Bashundhara Kings players
Bangladesh Women's Football League players
Women's association football forwards
People from Tangail District
Bangladeshi Hindus
Sethu FC players
Expatriate women's footballers in India
Bangladeshi expatriate sportspeople in India
Bangladeshi women's futsal players
South Asian Games bronze medalists for Bangladesh
South Asian Games medalists in football
Indian Women's League players